The Upper Aulaqi Sultanate was a state in the British Aden Protectorate and the Federation of South Arabia.  Its capital was Nisab.

History

The Lower Aulaqi sultans separated from the Upper Aulaqi in the 18th century.

In September 1879 Sultan Awadh bin Abdulla was dethroned in consequence of old age and was succeeded by his eldest son Abdulla. 

Sultan Abdulla bin Awadh died on 11 December 1887 and was succeeded by his son the present Sultan, Salih bin Abdulla.

A treaty was concluded between the British and the Upper Aulaqi Sultan on 18 March 1904 and ratified on 23 April 1904.

The Upper Aulaqi Sultanate joined the Federation of South Arabia in June 1964, the last one to join. The last sultan was Sultan Awad ibn Salih Al Awlaqi.

The last ruler was deposed in 1967 upon the founding of the People's Republic of South Yemen and the area is now part of the Republic of Yemen.

Rulers
The ruler of the Upper Aulaqi Sultanate bore the title Sultan al-Saltana al-`Awlaqiyya al-`Ulya.

Sultans  
....–....                Munassar 
....–....                Farid ibn Munassar 
....–1862                `Abd Allah ibn Farid 
1862 – September 1879            `Awad ibn `Abd Allah 
1879 – 11 December 1887         `Abd Allah ibn `Awad 
December 1887 – 1935            Salih ibn `Abd Allah 
1935 – 29 November 1967         `Awad ibn Salih al-`Awlaqi

See also 
Upper Aulaqi Sheikhdom
Aden Protectorate

References

External links
Map of Arabia (1905-1923) including the states of Aden Protectorate

History of Yemen
Sultanates
Former countries in the Middle East
18th-century establishments in Asia
1967 disestablishments in Asia
Former sultanates
Former British protectorates